9to5 (listed in the opening credits as Nine to Five) is a 1980 American comedy film directed by Colin Higgins, who wrote the screenplay with Patricia Resnick. It stars Jane Fonda, Lily Tomlin, and Dolly Parton as three working women who live out their fantasies of getting even with and overthrowing the company's autocratic, "sexist, egotistical, lying, hypocritical bigot" boss, played by Dabney Coleman.

The film grossed over $103.9 million. As a star vehicle for Parton—already established as a successful singer, musician and songwriter—it launched her permanently into mainstream popular culture. A television series of the same name based on the film ran for five seasons, and a musical play, based upon the film (also titled 9 to 5), with new songs written by Parton, opened on Broadway on April 30, 2009.

9 to 5 is number 74 on the American Film Institute's "100 Funniest Movies" and has a 68% approval rating on review aggregator website Rotten Tomatoes.

Plot
Reserved housewife Judy Bernly must start work as a secretary at Consolidated Companies after her husband separates with her. Judy is put under the supervision of experienced and sharp-tongued widow Violet Newstead. Both work under the egotistical, sexist Vice President Franklin Hart, whom Violet once trained and who spreads the false rumor that he and his attractive secretary, Doralee Rhodes (who is married), are having an affair.

When Hart turns down Violet for a promotion in favour of a man who is below her, Violet reveals to Doralee the rumor about the affair, leading both women to take the afternoon off drinking at a local bar. Judy joins them after learning of the dismissal of a friendly co-worker.

Unable to think of a way to improve their situation, they spend the evening smoking marijuana at Doralee's house and fantasizing about how they would get revenge on Hart: Judy would shoot him like a hunter does a deer, Doralee would hog tie him and roast him over a slow fire, while Violet would poison his coffee.

The next day, a frustrated Violet accidentally puts rat poison in Hart's coffee, but before he can drink it, his desk chair malfunctions and he blacks out after hitting his head on a credenza. Violet realizes her mistake and thinks the poisoned coffee caused Hart to black out. She and Judy meet Doralee at the hospital just in time to overhear a doctor pronounce a man dead from poisoning.

Thinking the dead man is Hart, Violet steals the body to prevent the performing of an autopsy, but while arguing with Judy and Doralee, she crashes her car, damaging a fender. When Doralee retrieves a tire iron from the trunk to fix the fender, she discovers the body is not Hart and they return it to the hospital.

The next morning, Hart shocks the women when he arrives for work as usual. In the ladies room, Doralee explains that Hart hit his head, but did not drink the coffee. Relieved that nothing will come out of the night's events, the ladies agree to meet for happy hour at the end of the day. However, Hart's loyal administrative assistant, Roz, overhears their conversation and reports everything back to Hart.

Hart summons Doralee to his office and offers her a choice: if she spends the night with him, he will not report her, Judy, and Violet for attempted murder. Doralee refuses and when Hart refuses to hear her out, she ties him up and stuffs a scarf he had given her as a gift in his mouth to keep him quiet. Hart eventually gets loose, which leads Judy to shoot at him with Doralee's handgun.

Ultimately, the women discover Hart has been selling Consolidated inventory and pocketing the proceeds, so they blackmail him into keeping quiet. When they are told that invoices Violet ordered that should prove Hart's crimes will not arrive for 4–6 weeks, they confine Hart to his bedroom wearing a hang gliding suit tied to a remote controlled garage door opener.

While Hart is out of the office, they implement several programs that are popular with the workers, including an in-office day care center, equal pay for men and women, flexible hours, and a job sharing program where employees can work part time.

Days before the invoices arrive, Hart's adoring wife returns from a cruise and frees him, giving him the time to buy back the inventory he sold. Before Hart can report Judy, Doralee, and Violet to the police, the chairman of the board, Russell Tinsworthy, arrives to meet with Hart. He congratulates him on his improvements to the office which have resulted in a 20% increase in productivity. As a result, he invites Hart to join him on a multiyear project in Brazil and Hart reluctantly is forced to accept.

Violet, Judy, and Doralee celebrate their success. Violet is eventually promoted to vice president, Judy leaves Consolidated to marry the Xerox representative, and Doralee leaves to become a country western singer. Hart is kidnapped by a tribe of Amazons and is never heard from again.

Cast

 Jane Fonda as Judy Bernly, a new employee for whom Consolidated is her first job after being a housewife. She is forced to get a job after her husband leaves her for his young secretary whom he cheated on Judy with. Soon after starting work, she befriends Violet and Doralee.
 Lily Tomlin as Violet Newstead, a widow with four kids who has been working at Consolidated for twelve years. Despite being very knowledgeable about the company and having once trained him, Hart treats her like a secretary and gives a promotion she wanted to a man. She is the most senior supervisor on her floor and becomes responsible for training Judy, whom she eventually befriends. 
 Dolly Parton as Doralee Rhodes, Frank Hart's attractive, married secretary who he consistently flirts with and sexually harasses. He also gives her presents he tells Violet are for his wife, and spreads an untrue rumor that he and Doralee are having an affair, resulting in the staff shunning her. 
 Dabney Coleman as Franklin Hart Jr., a Vice President of Consolidated who is the boss of Judy, Violet, Roz, and Doralee. Despite being married, he is not shy about flirting or sexually harassing other women, especially Doralee, and refers to the secretaries on his floor as his "girls". He also steals an idea from Violet, and tries to embezzle from Consolidated.
 Sterling Hayden as Russell Tinsworthy, Consolidated's chairman of the board who, impressed with what he thinks is Frank's work improving his office environment, forces him to come work with him on a project in Brazil.
 Elizabeth Wilson as Roz, Hart's sycophantic, loyal administrative assistant who constantly eavesdrops on the other staff.
 Henry Jones as Hinkle, Consolidated's president.
 Lawrence Pressman as Dick, Judy's ex-husband.
 Marian Mercer as Missy Hart, Franklin's sweet-natured wife who adores him and is oblivious to his cheating.
 Renn Woods as Barbara, one of Judy and Violet's co-workers
 Norma Donaldson as Betty, another co-worker
 Roxanna Bonilla-Giannini as Maria, a co-worker who Judy befriends. Roz reports to Hart on derisive comments she heard her make in the ladies' room, which results in her being fired. She later returns to work part-time under the women's job-sharing program.
 Peggy Pope as Margaret, an alcoholic secretary whom others refer to as "the old lush".
 Richard Stahl as Meade
 Ray Vitte as Eddie, a friend of Violet's who works in the company mail room, but aspires to become an executive.

Production
The film was based on an idea by Jane Fonda, who had recently formed her own production company, IPC Films:
My ideas for films always come from things that I hear and perceive in my daily life ... A very old friend of mine had started an organization in Boston called "Nine To Five", which was an association of women office workers. I heard them talking about their work and they had some great stories. And I've always been attracted to those 1940s films with three female stars.
Fonda said the film was at first going to be a drama, but "any way we did it, it seemed too preachy, too much of a feminist line. I'd wanted to work with Lily [Tomlin] for some time, and it suddenly occurred to [her producing partner] Bruce and me that we should make it a comedy." Patricia Resnick wrote the first draft drama, and Fonda cast herself, Lily Tomlin, and Dolly Parton in the leads, the last in her first film role.

Colin Higgins then came on board to direct and rewrite the script; part of his job was to make room for all three in the script. Higgins said Fonda was a very encouraging producer, who allowed him to push back production while the script was being rewritten. "He's a very nice, quiet, low-key guy", said Parton of Higgins. "I don't know what I would have done if I'd had one of those mean directors on my first film." Higgins admitted "he expected some tension", from working with three stars, "but they were totally professional, great fun and a joy to work with. I just wish everything would be as easy."

Fonda stated that the resulting film "remains a 'labour film'", but that she hoped it to be "of a new kind, different from the Grapes of Wrath or Salt of the Earth". "We took out a lot of stuff that was filmed, even stuff the director, Colin Higgins, thought worked but which I asked to have taken out. I'm just super-sensitive to anything that smacks of the soapbox or lecturing the audience".

Fonda said she did a lot of research, focusing on women who had begun work late in life due to divorce or being widowed.
What I found was that secretaries know the work they do is important, is skilled, but they also know they're not treated with respect. They call themselves "office wives". They have to put gas in the boss's car, get his coffee, buy the presents for his wife and mistress. So when we came to do the film, we said to Colin [Higgins], OK, what you have to do is write a screenplay which shows you can run an office without a boss, but you can't run an office without the secretaries!

Filming locations
The home of Franklin Hart is located at 10431 Bellagio Road in Bel Air, Los Angeles. According to commentary included in the DVD release of the film, the home was, at the time, owned by the Chandler family, publishers of the Los Angeles Times. The Consolidated offices were presumably in the Pacific Financial Center located at 800 W 6th Street, at South Flower Street in Los Angeles. Although the story appears to be set in Los Angeles, the opening credit montage, set to the title song, is mostly composed of shots from downtown San Francisco. These shots include an electric MUNI bus fitted with a KFOG 104.5 FM advertisement, the Market Street clock, and a brief glimpse of the San Francisco twins, Marian and Vivian Brown.

Soundtrack

Theme song

The film's theme song, "9 to 5", written and recorded by Parton, became one of her biggest hits of the decade. While filming the 9 to 5 movie, Parton found she could use her long acrylic fingernails to simulate the sound of a typewriter. She wrote the song on set by clicking her nails together and forming the beat. The song went to number one for two weeks on the Billboard Hot 100, as well as the U.S. country singles charts, and was nominated for several awards, including the Academy Award for Best Original Song. It won the 1981 People's Choice Award for "Favorite Motion Picture Song", and two 1982 Grammy Awards: for "Country Song of the Year" and "Female Country Vocal of the Year" (it was nominated for four Grammys). Additionally, it was certified platinum by the RIAA.

Reception
Roger Ebert gave the film 3 stars out of 4 and called it "pleasant entertainment, and I liked it, despite its uneven qualities and a plot that's almost too preposterous for the material." Ebert singled out Dolly Parton as "a natural-born movie star" who "contains so much energy, so much life and unstudied natural exuberance that watching her do anything in this movie is a pleasure." Vincent Canby of The New York Times was less enthused, writing, "It's clearly a movie that began as someone's bright idea, which then went into production before anyone had time to give it a well-defined personality."

Gene Siskel of the Chicago Tribune gave the film 2.5 stars out of 4 and wrote, "The most pleasant surprise is the appearance of Dolly Parton, who with this one film establishes herself as a thoroughly engaging movie star. The biggest disappointment is that this Jane Fonda comedy about a trio of secretaries out to get their boss doesn't have more bite ... Instead of getting darker and darker, 'Nine to Five' gets lighter and lighter until it loses most of the energy it established so well early on." Variety stated, "Although it can probably be argued that Patricia Resnick and director Colin Higgins' script at times borders on the inane, the bottom line is that this picture is a lot of fun." Kevin Thomas of the Los Angeles Times wrote that the film "appears to be an audience pleaser that never misses an intended laugh. However, it strays so far from reality for so long that it threatens to become mired in overly complicated silliness and to lose sight of the serious satirical points it wants to make. Happily, it does pull together for a finish that's as strong as it is funny."

Gary Arnold of The Washington Post thought the film "runs a merely weak comic premise into the ground with coarse, laborious execution". He thought that Dolly Parton was the film's "only reassuring aspect", as she seemed "an instantly likable natural on the movie screen, too". David Ansen of Newsweek called the film "a disappointment ... It's not wild or dark enough to qualify as a truly disturbing farce and it's too fanciful and silly to succeed as realistic satire. Politically and esthetically, it's harmless—a mildly amusing romp that tends to get swallowed up by its own overly intricate plot."

Ronald Reagan wrote in his presidential diary that he and his wife Nancy watched the film on Valentine's Day 1981. He wrote, "Funny—but one scene made me mad. A truly funny scene if the 3 gals had played getting drunk but no they had to get stoned on pot. It was an endorsement of Pot smoking for any young person who sees the picture."

While the film received mixed reviews from critics during its initial theatrical release, it has since been reappraised for its commentary on workplace sexism and the gender pay gap. In a 2018 review for The Guardian, Peter Bradshaw wrote, "Thirty-eight years on, this tale of misogyny, kidnap and rattling typewriters is a boldly progressive piece of film-making." The film's cultural legacy, path to production, and impact on the women's labor movement are explored in the 2022 documentary Still Working 9 to 5.

The film holds a score of 68% on Rotten Tomatoes based on 91 reviews. The critical consensus reads: "It might not be much of a way to make a living, but 9 to 5 is a wonderfully cast comedy that makes some sharp points about gender roles in the workplace." Metacritic gave the film a score of 58 based on 12 reviews, indicating "mixed or average reviews".

Accolades

The film is recognized by American Film Institute in these lists:
 2000: AFI's 100 Years...100 Laughs – No. 74
 2004: AFI's 100 Years...100 Songs:
 "9 to 5" – No. 78
 2006: AFI's 100 Years...100 Cheers – Nominated

Television series

The film inspired a sitcom version, which aired from 1982 to 1983 and from 1986 to 1988. The show, which aired on ABC (1982–83) and in first-run syndication (1986–88), featured Parton's younger sister, Rachel Dennison, in Parton's role; Rita Moreno and Valerie Curtin, respectively, took over Tomlin and Fonda's roles. In the second version of the show, Sally Struthers replaced Moreno. A total of 85 episodes were filmed.

2009 Broadway musical

In an interview aired on September 30, 2005, on Larry King Live, Parton revealed that she was writing the songs for a musical stage adaptation of the film. A private reading of the musical took place on January 19, 2007. Further private presentations were held in New York City in summer 2007.

In early March 2008, Center Theatre Group artistic director Michael Ritchie announced that 9 to 5 would have its pre-Broadway run at the center's Ahmanson Theatre in Los Angeles beginning September 21, 2008, with Allison Janney starring as Violet, joined by Stephanie J. Block as Judy, Megan Hilty as Doralee, and Marc Kudisch as Franklin Hart Jr. The book for 9 to 5: The Musical was written by Patricia Resnick, who co-authored the film. Andy Blankenbuehler choreographed the show, and Joe Mantello directed.

According to playbill.com, the musical opened on Broadway at the Marquis Theatre in previews on April 7, 2009, and officially on April 30, 2009. However, due to low ticket sales and gross, the production closed on September 6, 2009. A national tour began in September 2010.

Possible sequel

In the 1980s, Universal developed a sequel with Colin Higgins. Tom Mankiewicz worked on it for a while and says that while Dolly Parton was enthusiastic, Jane Fonda was not and Higgins' heart was not in it.

In a TV interview broadcast on BBC One in the United Kingdom in 2005, the movie's stars Fonda, Tomlin, and Parton all expressed interest in starring in a sequel. Fonda said if the right script was written she would definitely do it, suggesting a suitable name for a 21st-century sequel would be 24/7. Parton suggested they had better hurry up before they reach retirement age. In the DVD commentary, the three reiterate their enthusiasm; Fonda suggests a sequel should cover outsourcing and they agree Hart would have to return as their nemesis.

In a 2018 interview, Dolly Parton announced that a sequel was in the works to bring the story into a modern-day setting. In July 2018, Jane Fonda also confirmed that a sequel was in the works with herself, Tomlin and Parton returning to their roles as mentors to a new generation of women. Fonda revealed that she is also an executive producer on the project. Rashida Jones and Pat Resnick have been attached to write a script. On October 23, 2018, Fonda reiterated news about the development of a sequel on GMA Day. On October 30, 2019, Parton announced the sequel had been dropped.

In 2022 though, all three actresses made a full reunion of the 9 to 5 cast, after Parton appeared in a guest starring role in the final episode of the Netflix comedy streaming TV series Grace and Frankie, which starred Fonda and Tomlin for seven seasons.

See also
 Horrible Bosses, a 2011 comedy film

Further reading

References

External links

 
 
 
 

1980 films
1980s buddy comedy films
1980s business films
1980s female buddy films
1980s feminist films
20th Century Fox films
American buddy comedy films
American business films
American female buddy films
American feminist films
1980s English-language films
American films about revenge
Films adapted into television shows
Films directed by Colin Higgins
Films scored by Charles Fox
Films shot in Los Angeles
American films with live action and animation
Films with screenplays by Colin Higgins
Films with screenplays by Patricia Resnick
Workplace comedy films
Films about sexual harassment
1980 comedy films
Films set in offices
1980s American films
Films about companies